Uncha Mountain Red Hills Provincial Park is a provincial park in British Columbia, Canada, comprising two parcels of land on the north and south shores of Francois Lake.  Total area of the park is 9,421 hectares.

See also
Francois Lake Provincial Park

References
BC Parks webpage

Provincial parks of British Columbia
Nechako Country
Regional District of Bulkley-Nechako